Geospatial predictive modeling is conceptually rooted in the principle that the occurrences of
events being modeled are limited in distribution. Occurrences of events are neither uniform
nor random in distribution – there are spatial environment factors (infrastructure, sociocultural,
topographic, etc.) that constrain and influence where the locations of events occur.
Geospatial predictive modeling attempts to describe those constraints and influences by
spatially correlating occurrences of historical geospatial locations with environmental factors
that represent those constraints and influences. Geospatial predictive modeling is a process
for analyzing events through a geographic filter in order to make statements of likelihood for
event occurrence or emergence.

Predictive models 
There are two broad types of geospatial predictive models: deductive and inductive.
 The risk assessment was generated using an inductive predictive modeling tool.

Deductive method 
The deductive method relies on qualitative data or a subject matter expert (SME) to describe
the relationship between event occurrences and factors that describe the environment. As a
result, the deductive process generally will rely on more subjective information. This means
that the modeler could potentially be limiting the model by only inputting a number of factors that the human brain can comprehend.

An example of a deductive model is as follows:
Sets of events are typically found …
 Between 100 and 700 meters from airports.
 In the grassland land cover category.
 At elevations between 1000 and 1500 meters.

In this deductive model, high suitability locations for the set of events are constrained and
influenced by non-empirically calculated spatial ranges for airports, land cover, and elevation: lower
suitability areas would be everywhere else. The accuracy and detail of the deductive model is
limited by the depth of qualitative data inputs to the model.

Inductive method 
The inductive method relies on the empirically-calculated spatial relationship between
historical or known event occurrence locations and factors that make up the environment
(infrastructure, socio-culture, topographic, etc.). Each event occurrence is plotted in
geographic space and a quantitative relationship is defined between the event occurrence
and the factors that make up the environment. The advantage of this method is that software
can be developed to empirically discover – harnessing the speed of computers, which is
crucial when hundreds of factors are involved – both known and unknown correlations
between factors and events. Those quantitative relationship values are then processed by a
statistical function to find spatial patterns that define high and low suitability areas for event
occurrence.

See also
 Predictive Analysis
 Predictive modelling
 Suitability analysis

References

Geographic information systems
Spatial analysis